Shepherds Well railway station is on the Dover branch of the Chatham Main Line in England, and serves the village of Shepherdswell, Kent.

The station and all trains that serve the station are operated by Southeastern.

It appears in the timetable and online enquiry systems as "Shepherds Well" but the platform signs read "Shepherdswell". It is adjacent to the terminus of the East Kent heritage line, which is spelt as one word: Shepherdswell.

The booking office in the station building on the country-bound platform is open only for very limited hours on Mondays to Fridays mornings but a Permit To Travel ticket machine (also on the country-bound platform) caters for out-of-hours ticketing.

The station and the line it serves were built by the London, Chatham & Dover Railway.

Services 
All services at Shepherds Well are operated by Southeastern using  EMUs.

The typical off-peak service in trains per hour is:
 1 tph to  via 
 1 tph to 

During the peak hours, the service is increased to 2 tph.

References

External links 

Dover District
Railway stations in Kent
DfT Category E stations
Former London, Chatham and Dover Railway stations
Railway stations in Great Britain opened in 1861
Railway stations served by Southeastern
1861 establishments in England